is the fourth single by The Pillows. It was released as an 8cm CD on March 24, 1995. The B-side track, "Girlfriend (Love Letter Version)", which was an arrangement of the A-side title track, was used in the award winning 1995 romance movie, Love Letter.

Track listing
"Girlfriend"
"Girlfriend (Love Letter Version)" 
"Boku de Irareru You Ni" (僕でいられるように)

References

1995 singles
The Pillows songs
1995 songs
King Records (Japan) singles
Song articles with missing songwriters